Pierangelo Belli (born 29 July 1944 in Limbiate) is an Italian former professional footballer who played as a goalkeeper.

He played for 6 seasons (51 games) in Serie A for A.C. Milan and Hellas Verona.

Honours
Milan
 Serie A champion: 1967–68.
 Coppa Italia winner: 1966–67, 1971–72.
 European Cup winner: 1968–69.
 Intercontinental Cup winner: 1969.

References

1944 births
Living people
Italian footballers
Association football goalkeepers
Serie A players
S.S. Chieti Calcio players
Calcio Lecco 1912 players
A.C. Milan players
Hellas Verona F.C. players
S.S.D. Pro Sesto players
A.C. Legnano players